The 1918 VFL season was the 22nd season of the Victorian Football League (VFL), the highest level senior Australian rules football competition in Victoria.

Played during the final year of World War I, eight of the league's nine senior clubs competed, an increase of two from the previous year with only  absent. The season ran from 11 May until 7 September, and comprised a 14-game home-and-away season followed by a finals series featuring the top four clubs.

The premiership was won by the South Melbourne Football Club for the second time, after it defeated  by five points in the 1918 VFL Grand Final.

Premiership season
In 1918, the VFL competition consisted of eight teams of 18 on-the-field players each, with no "reserves", although any of the 18 players who had left the playing field for any reason could later resume their place on the field at any time during the match.

Each team played each other twice in a home-and-away season of 14 rounds.

Once the 14 round home-and-away season had finished, the 1918 VFL Premiers were determined by the specific format and conventions of the amended "Argus system".

Round 1

|- bgcolor="#CCCCFF"
| Home team
| Home team score
| Away team
| Away team score
| Venue
| Date
|- bgcolor="#FFFFFF"
| 
| 7.15 (57)
| 
| 4.7 (31)
| Lake Oval
| 11 May 1918
|- bgcolor="#FFFFFF"
| 
| 4.16 (40)
| 
| 4.10 (34)
| Junction Oval
| 11 May 1918
|- bgcolor="#FFFFFF"
| 
| 5.16 (46)
| 
| 4.10 (34)
| Punt Road Oval
| 11 May 1918
|- bgcolor="#FFFFFF"
| 
| 8.17 (65)
| 
| 4.6 (30)
| Victoria Park
| 11 May 1918

Round 2

|- bgcolor="#CCCCFF"
| Home team
| Home team score
| Away team
| Away team score
| Venue
| Date
|- bgcolor="#FFFFFF"
| 
| 5.8 (38)
| 
| 12.6 (78)
| Brunswick Street Oval
| 18 May 1918
|- bgcolor="#FFFFFF"
| 
| 8.13 (61)
| 
| 6.18 (54)
| EMCG
| 18 May 1918
|- bgcolor="#FFFFFF"
| 
| 8.5 (53)
| 
| 7.16 (58)
| Princes Park
| 18 May 1918
|- bgcolor="#FFFFFF"
| 
| 5.6 (36)
| 
| 7.6 (48)
| Corio Oval
| 18 May 1918

Round 3

|- bgcolor="#CCCCFF"
| Home team
| Home team score
| Away team
| Away team score
| Venue
| Date
|- bgcolor="#FFFFFF"
| 
| 11.11 (77)
| 
| 7.9 (51)
| Princes Park
| 25 May 1918
|- bgcolor="#FFFFFF"
| 
| 6.8 (44)
| 
| 10.12 (72)
| Punt Road Oval
| 25 May 1918
|- bgcolor="#FFFFFF"
| 
| 6.16 (52)
| 
| 4.12 (36)
| Corio Oval
| 25 May 1918
|- bgcolor="#FFFFFF"
| 
| 12.13 (85)
| 
| 9.13 (67)
| Lake Oval
| 25 May 1918

Round 4

|- bgcolor="#CCCCFF"
| Home team
| Home team score
| Away team
| Away team score
| Venue
| Date
|- bgcolor="#FFFFFF"
| 
| 11.10 (76)
| 
| 8.8 (56)
| Victoria Park
| 1 June 1918
|- bgcolor="#FFFFFF"
| 
| 4.13 (37)
| 
| 8.27 (75)
| EMCG
| 1 June 1918
|- bgcolor="#FFFFFF"
| 
| 6.13 (49)
| 
| 6.8 (44)
| Junction Oval
| 3 June 1918
|- bgcolor="#FFFFFF"
| 
| 10.14 (74)
| 
| 8.14 (62)
| Brunswick Street Oval
| 3 June 1918

Round 5

|- bgcolor="#CCCCFF"
| Home team
| Home team score
| Away team
| Away team score
| Venue
| Date
|- bgcolor="#FFFFFF"
| 
| 6.13 (49)
| 
| 7.18 (60)
| Corio Oval
| 8 June 1918
|- bgcolor="#FFFFFF"
| 
| 14.21 (105)
| 
| 6.9 (45)
| Victoria Park
| 8 June 1918
|- bgcolor="#FFFFFF"
| 
| 9.12 (66)
| 
| 2.13 (25)
| Brunswick Street Oval
| 8 June 1918
|- bgcolor="#FFFFFF"
| 
| 11.10 (76)
| 
| 10.12 (72)
| Lake Oval
| 8 June 1918

Round 6

|- bgcolor="#CCCCFF"
| Home team
| Home team score
| Away team
| Away team score
| Venue
| Date
|- bgcolor="#FFFFFF"
| 
| 5.13 (43)
| 
| 7.18 (60)
| Punt Road Oval
| 15 June 1918
|- bgcolor="#FFFFFF"
| 
| 4.8 (32)
| 
| 7.10 (52)
| EMCG
| 15 June 1918
|- bgcolor="#FFFFFF"
| 
| 7.11 (53)
| 
| 3.6 (24)
| Victoria Park
| 15 June 1918
|- bgcolor="#FFFFFF"
| 
| 16.15 (111)
| 
| 7.3 (45)
| Princes Park
| 15 June 1918

Round 7

|- bgcolor="#CCCCFF"
| Home team
| Home team score
| Away team
| Away team score
| Venue
| Date
|- bgcolor="#FFFFFF"
| 
| 12.14 (86)
| 
| 4.10 (34)
| Lake Oval
| 22 June 1918
|- bgcolor="#FFFFFF"
| 
| 15.13 (103)
| 
| 5.9 (39)
| Junction Oval
| 22 June 1918
|- bgcolor="#FFFFFF"
| 
| 4.9 (33)
| 
| 14.14 (98)
| EMCG
| 22 June 1918
|- bgcolor="#FFFFFF"
| 
| 6.15 (51)
| 
| 12.11 (83)
| Brunswick Street Oval
| 22 June 1918

Round 8

|- bgcolor="#CCCCFF"
| Home team
| Home team score
| Away team
| Away team score
| Venue
| Date
|- bgcolor="#FFFFFF"
| 
| 7.8 (50)
| 
| 7.13 (55)
| Corio Oval
| 29 June 1918
|- bgcolor="#FFFFFF"
| 
| 7.6 (48)
| 
| 3.5 (23)
| Brunswick Street Oval
| 29 June 1918
|- bgcolor="#FFFFFF"
| 
| 3.4 (22)
| 
| 5.15 (45)
| EMCG
| 29 June 1918
|- bgcolor="#FFFFFF"
| 
| 6.13 (49)
| 
| 6.5 (41)
| Princes Park
| 29 June 1918

Round 9

|- bgcolor="#CCCCFF"
| Home team
| Home team score
| Away team
| Away team score
| Venue
| Date
|- bgcolor="#FFFFFF"
| 
| 12.14 (86)
| 
| 7.10 (52)
| Victoria Park
| 6 July 1918
|- bgcolor="#FFFFFF"
| 
| 12.14 (86)
| 
| 8.13 (61)
| Lake Oval
| 6 July 1918
|- bgcolor="#FFFFFF"
| 
| 6.14 (50)
| 
| 6.6 (42)
| Junction Oval
| 6 July 1918
|- bgcolor="#FFFFFF"
| 
| 7.16 (58)
| 
| 8.13 (61)
| Punt Road Oval
| 6 July 1918

Round 10

|- bgcolor="#CCCCFF"
| Home team
| Home team score
| Away team
| Away team score
| Venue
| Date
|- bgcolor="#FFFFFF"
| 
| 10.11 (71)
| 
| 6.7 (43)
| Brunswick Street Oval
| 13 July 1918
|- bgcolor="#FFFFFF"
| 
| 8.10 (58)
| 
| 5.9 (39)
| EMCG
| 13 July 1918
|- bgcolor="#FFFFFF"
| 
| 6.8 (44)
| 
| 7.9 (51)
| Victoria Park
| 13 July 1918
|- bgcolor="#FFFFFF"
| 
| 4.20 (44)
| 
| 2.5 (17)
| Junction Oval
| 13 July 1918

Round 11

|- bgcolor="#CCCCFF"
| Home team
| Home team score
| Away team
| Away team score
| Venue
| Date
|- bgcolor="#FFFFFF"
| 
| 10.20 (80)
| 
| 4.7 (31)
| Princes Park
| 20 July 1918
|- bgcolor="#FFFFFF"
| 
| 14.17 (101)
| 
| 7.9 (51)
| Lake Oval
| 20 July 1918
|- bgcolor="#FFFFFF"
| 
| 5.6 (36)
| 
| 11.6 (72)
| Corio Oval
| 20 July 1918
|- bgcolor="#FFFFFF"
| 
| 6.13 (49)
| 
| 11.10 (76)
| Punt Road Oval
| 20 July 1918

Round 12

|- bgcolor="#CCCCFF"
| Home team
| Home team score
| Away team
| Away team score
| Venue
| Date
|- bgcolor="#FFFFFF"
| 
| 8.10 (58)
| 
| 6.6 (42)
| EMCG
| 27 July 1918
|- bgcolor="#FFFFFF"
| 
| 5.13 (43)
| 
| 8.7 (55)
| Princes Park
| 27 July 1918
|- bgcolor="#FFFFFF"
| 
| 15.15 (105)
| 
| 10.11 (71)
| Punt Road Oval
| 27 July 1918
|- bgcolor="#FFFFFF"
| 
| 9.9 (63)
| 
| 6.14 (50)
| Junction Oval
| 27 July 1918

Round 13

|- bgcolor="#CCCCFF"
| Home team
| Home team score
| Away team
| Away team score
| Venue
| Date
|- bgcolor="#FFFFFF"
| 
| 10.7 (67)
| 
| 8.9 (57)
| Junction Oval
| 3 August 1918
|- bgcolor="#FFFFFF"
| 
| 12.13 (85)
| 
| 7.10 (52)
| Lake Oval
| 3 August 1918
|- bgcolor="#FFFFFF"
| 
| 8.12 (60)
| 
| 10.19 (79)
| Brunswick Street Oval
| 3 August 1918
|- bgcolor="#FFFFFF"
| 
| 10.7 (67)
| 
| 4.13 (37)
| Corio Oval
| 3 August 1918

Round 14

|- bgcolor="#CCCCFF"
| Home team
| Home team score
| Away team
| Away team score
| Venue
| Date
|- bgcolor="#FFFFFF"
| 
| 7.12 (54)
| 
| 7.17 (59)
| Punt Road Oval
| 10 August 1918
|- bgcolor="#FFFFFF"
| 
| 10.27 (87)
| 
| 6.6 (42)
| Corio Oval
| 10 August 1918
|- bgcolor="#FFFFFF"
| 
| 9.14 (68)
| 
| 3.8 (26)
| Victoria Park
| 10 August 1918
|- bgcolor="#FFFFFF"
| 
| 10.14 (74)
| 
| 9.7 (61)
| Princes Park
| 10 August 1918

Ladder

Finals

All of the 1918 finals were played at the MCG so the home team in the semi-finals and preliminary final is purely the higher ranked team from the ladder but in the Grand Final the home team was the team that won the preliminary final.

The second semi-final was scheduled to be played on the 24th of August, but heavy rain caused a postponement to the 31st of August  the first postponement of a finals match in VFL history.

Semi-finals

|- bgcolor="#CCCCFF"
| Home team
| Score
| Away team
| Score
| Venue
| Date
|- bgcolor="#FFFFFF"
| 
| 7.16 (58)
| 
| 7.7 (49)
| MCG
| 17 August
|- bgcolor="#FFFFFF"
| 
| 8.10 (58)
| 
| 7.11 (53)
| MCG
| 31 August

Grand final

South Melbourne defeated Collingwood 9.8 (62) to 7.15 (57), in front of a crowd of 39,168 people. (For an explanation of scoring see Australian rules football).

Awards
 The 1918 VFL Premiership team was South Melbourne.
 The VFL's leading goalkicker was Ern Cowley of Carlton with 34 goals.
 Essendon took the "wooden spoon" in 1918.

Notable events
 Essendon and St Kilda re-entered the VFL competition. The Essendon players met their own expenses and played as amateurs, with the club donating all of its 1918 profits (which amounted to £194-19-8) to "patriotic and charitable purposes".
 In Round 2, Richmond recorded its first VFL win over Carlton after 23 consecutive losses, a losing streak dating back to Richmond's entry into the VFL in 1908.
 In Round 14, Len Phillips of Essendon, a fast, skilful rover, and a printer by trade, played the last of his 13 senior VFL matches  having played his first VFL match for St Kilda in 1914.

Notes

References
 Maplestone, M., Flying Higher: History of the Essendon Football Club 1872–1996, Essendon Football Club, (Melbourne), 1996. 
 Rogers, S. & Brown, A., Every Game Ever Played: VFL/AFL Results 1897–1997 (Sixth Edition), Viking Books, (Ringwood), 1998. 
 Ross, J. (ed), 100 Years of Australian Football 1897–1996: The Complete Story of the AFL, All the Big Stories, All the Great Pictures, All the Champions, Every AFL Season Reported, Viking, (Ringwood), 1996.

External links
 1918 Season – AFL Tables

Australian Football League seasons
VFL season